Prof Nils Eberhard Svedelius ForMemRS HFRSE (1873–1960) was a Swedish botanist. He was an expert on marine algae.

Biography
He was born in Stockholm on 5 August 1873 the second son of Carl Svedelius LLD (1861-1951), a senior judge in the Supreme Court of Justice, and his wife, Ebba Katarina Skytte, from the family of Skytte of Satra. In 1914 he married Lisa Thegerstrom (d.1955). He died on 2 August 1960.

Career
He studied Botany at Uppsala University under Prof Frans Reinhold Kjellman, gaining his first degree in 1895 and second in 1900. He began lecturing at the university after defending his doctoral thesis, Studies in the marine algae of the Baltic Sea, in 1901. 

He won a travelling scholarship and spent the academic year 1902/3 in Ceylon, studying marine algae mainly in the Galle region. He also visited Singapore and Java. 

He remained at Uppsala for his entire career, becoming professor in 1914 and retiring in 1938.

Honours
In 1944 he was elected a foreign member of the Royal Society. In 1955 he was elected an Honorary Fellow of the Royal Society of Edinburgh.

Publications
Carl Peter Thunberg (1743-1928) (1943)

References

1873 births
1960 deaths
20th-century Swedish botanists
Scientists from Stockholm
Fellows of the Royal Society
Honorary Fellows of the Royal Society of Edinburgh